The 2016 NRL season consists of 26 weekly regular season rounds starting on Thursday 3 March, and concluded on Sunday 2 October with the grand final.

Round 1

Round 2

Round 3

Round 4

Round 5

Round 6

Round 7

Round 8 (Anzac Round)

Round 9

Round 10

Round 11

Round 12

Round 13

Round 14

Round 15

Round 16

Round 17

Round 18

Round 19

Round 20

The Sharks beat Newcastle to win 15 games in a row.

Round 21

Round 22

The Sharks suffer their first defeat since Round 3 against Manly

Round 23

Round 24

Round 25

Round 26

During this round there was a very unusual event. The Melbourne Storm and Cronulla Sharks fought for the minor Premiership with the Sharks going down 26-6 to the Storm. However because of the 20 point loss the Cronulla Sharks dropped to third, overtaken by the Canberra Raiders who beat Wests Tigers 52-10. This then resulted in a different top 2 then the ones that fought for the Minor Premiership.

Finals series 

For the fifth year the NRL uses the finals system previously implemented by the ARL competition from the 1990s (also used as the AFL final eight system) to decide the grand finalists from the top eight finishing teams. were featured in the preceding finals series.

Qualifying And Elimination Finals  

1st Elimination Final

1st Qualifying Final

2nd Qualifying Final

2nd Elimination Final

Semi-finals 

1st Semi-final

Match decided in extra time.
2nd Semi-final

Preliminary Finals 

1st Preliminary Final

2nd Preliminary Final

2016 NRL Grand Final

References

Results